The Virtu (2006) is a fantasy novel by Sarah Monette. It is the second book of the Doctrine of Labyrinths series, which includes Mélusine, The Mirador, and Corambis.

Plot summary
Felix Harrogate, having recovered from the abuse he suffered in Mélusine, is ready to regain the power and status that he lost.  With his half-brother Mildmay and Mehitabel Parr, a young governess, he decides to return to Mélusine to repair the Virtu.

See also

 Doctrine of Labyrinths

External links
 Sarah Monette's official site

2006 American novels
American fantasy novels
Ace Books books